Le Tellier or Letellier is a surname, and may refer to:

 Camille le Tellier de Louvois (1675–1718), French cleric
 Charles-Maurice Le Tellier (1642–1710), Archbishop of Reims
Francis Letellier (born 1964), French journalist
 François-Michel le Tellier, Marquis de Louvois (1641–1691)
 Hervé Le Tellier (born 1957), French writer
 Louis Charles César Le Tellier, duc d'Estrées (1695–1771)
 Louis François Marie Le Tellier (1668–1701), French statesman
 Luc Letellier de St-Just (1820–1881), Canadian politician
 Louis LeTellier (1887–1975), football coach
 Michel Le Tellier (1603–1685), French statesman
 Robert Letellier (born 1953), South African writer on music

See also
Letellier, Manitoba
, 

French-language surnames